Carlos González Ferrer (born 14 November 1959) is a Mexican boxer. He competed in the men's featherweight event at the 1980 Summer Olympics. At the 1980 Summer Olympics, he defeated Nidal Haddad and Ravsalyn Otgonbayar, before losing to Rudi Fink.

References

External links
 

1959 births
Living people
Mexican male boxers
Olympic boxers of Mexico
Boxers at the 1980 Summer Olympics
Place of birth missing (living people)
Featherweight boxers